The Miami Marlins' 2013 season was the 21st season for the Major League Baseball franchise, and the second as the "Miami" Marlins. The Marlins finished the season with a 62-100 record, their 2nd worst record as an MLB franchise, and failed to make the playoffs for the 10th consecutive season.

Season standings

National League East

National League Wild Card

Record vs. opponents

Game log 

|- align="text-align:center;" bgcolor="#ffbbbb"
| 1 || April 1 || @ Nationals || 0–2 || Strasburg (1–0) || Nolasco (0–1) || Soriano (1) || 45,274 || 0–1 || L1
|- align="text-align:center;" bgcolor="#ffbbbb"
| 2 || April 3 || @ Nationals || 0–3 || González (1–0) || Slowey (0–1) || Soriano (2) || 26,269 || 0–2 || L2
|- align="text-align:center" bgcolor="#ffbbbb"
| 3 || April 4 || @ Nationals || 1–6 || Zimmermann (1–0) || LeBlanc (0–1) || || 25,123 || 0–3 || L3
|- align="text-align:center" bgcolor="#bbffbb"
| 4 || April 5 || @ Mets || 7–5 || Sanabia (1–0) || Hefner (0–1) ||  || 24,935 || 1–3 || W1
|- align="text-align:center;" bgcolor="#ffbbbb"
| 5 || April 6 || @ Mets || 3–7 || Lyon (1–0) || Webb (0–1) ||  || 28,474 || 1–4 || L1
|- align="text-align:center;" bgcolor="#ffbbbb"
| 6 || April 7 || @ Mets || 3–4 || Rice (1–0) || Cishek (0–1) ||  || 29,780 || 1–5 || L2
|- style="text-align:center;" bgcolor="#ffbbbb"
| 7 || April 8 || Braves || 0–2 || Maholm (2–0) || Slowey (0–2) || Kimbrel (3) || 34,439 || 1–6 || L3
|- style="text-align:center;" bgcolor="#ffbbbb"
| 8 || April 9 || Braves || 2–3 || Medlen (1–1) || LeBlanc (0–2) || Kimbrel (4) || 14,222 || 1–7 || L4
|- style="text-align:center;" bgcolor="#ffbbbb"
| 9 || April 10 || Braves || 0–8 || Minor (2–0) || Sanabia (1–1) ||  || 13,810 || 1–8 || L5
|- style="text-align:center;" bgcolor="#ffbbbb"
| 10 || April 12 || Phillies || 1–3 || Aumont (1–0) || Rauch (0–1) || Papelbon (2) || 17,923 || 1–9 || L6
|- style="text-align:center;" bgcolor="#bbffbb"
| 11 || April 13 || Phillies || 2–1 || Cishek (1–1) || Aumont (1–1) ||  || 20,037 || 2–9 || W1
|- style="text-align:center;" bgcolor="#ffbbbb"
| 12 || April 14 || Phillies || 1–2 || Halladay (1–2) || Rauch (0–2) || Papelbon (2) || 21,412 || 2–10 || L1
|- style="text-align:center;" bgcolor="#ffbbbb"
| 13 || April 15 || Nationals || 3–10 || Zimmermann (3–0) || LeBlanc (0–3) ||  || 15,933 || 2–11 || L2
|- style="text-align:center;" bgcolor="#bbffbb"
| 14 || April 16 || Nationals || 8–2 || Sanabia (2–1) || Haren (1–2) ||  || 16,200 || 3–11 || W1
|- style="text-align:center;" bgcolor="#ffbbbb"
| 15 || April 17 || Nationals || 1–6 || Detwiler (1–0) || Nolasco (0–2) ||  || 22,302 || 3–12 || L1
|- style="text-align:center;" bgcolor="#ffbbbb"
| 16 || April 18 || @ Reds || 1–11 || Cingrani (1–0) || Fernández (0–1) || || 14,916 || 3–13 || L2
|- style="text-align:center;" bgcolor="#bbffbb"
| 17 || April 19 || @ Reds || 2–1 || Dunn (1–0) || Chapman (2–1) || Cishek (1) || 26,112 || 4–13 || W1
|- style="text-align:center;" bgcolor="#ffbbbb"
| 18 || April 20 || @ Reds || 2–3 (13) || Simón (1–1) || Cishek (1–2) ||  || 35,645 || 4–14 || L1
|- style="text-align:center;" bgcolor="#ffbbbb"
| 19 || April 21 || @ Reds || 6–10 || Ondrusek (1–0) || Sanabia (2–2) ||  || 28,882 || 4–15 || L2
|- style="text-align:center;" bgcolor="#ffbbbb"
| 20 || April 23 || @ Twins || 3–4 || Correia (2–1) || Fernández (0–2) || Perkins (6) || 25,716 || 4–16 || L3
|- style="text-align:center;" bgcolor="#bbffbb"
| 21 || April 23 || @ Twins || 8–5 || Nolasco (1–2) || Pelfrey (2–2) || Cishek (2) || 23,300 || 5–16 || W1
|- style="text-align:center;" bgcolor="#ffbbbb"
| 22 || April 25 || Cubs || 3–4 || Camp (1–1) || Cishek (1–3) || Mármol (2) || 15,394 || 5–17 || L1
|- style="text-align:center;" bgcolor="#ffbbbb"
| 23 || April 26 || Cubs || 2–4 || Feldman (1–3) || LeBlanc (0–4) || Gregg (2) || 16,017 || 5–18 || L2
|- style="text-align:center;" bgcolor="#ffbbbb"
| 24 || April 27 || Cubs || 2–3 || Wood (2–1) || Sanabia (2–3) || Gregg (3) || 27,519 || 5–19 || L3
|- style="text-align:center;" bgcolor="#bbffbb"
| 25 || April 28 || Cubs || 6–4 || Nolasco (2–2) || Villanueva (1–1) || Cishek (3) || 19,817 || 6–19 || W1
|- style="text-align:center;" bgcolor="#bbffbb"
| 26 || April 29 || Mets || 4–3 || Rauch (1–2) || Marcum (0–2) ||  || 15,605 || 7–19 || W2
|- style="text-align:center;" bgcolor="#bbffbb"
| 27 || April 30 || Mets || 2–1 || Webb (1–1) || Hefner (0–3) ||  || 15,018 || 8–19 || W3
|-

|- style="text-align:center;" bgcolor="#ffbbbb"
| 28 || May 1 || Mets || 6–7 || Gee (2–4) || Ramos (0–1) || Parnell (3) || 16,188 || 8–20 || L1
|- style="text-align:center;" bgcolor="#ffbbbb"
| 29 || May 2 || @ Phillies || 2–7 || Kendrick (3–1) || Sanabia (2–4) ||  || 36,978 || 8–21 || L2
|- style="text-align:center;" bgcolor="#ffbbbb"
| 30 || May 3 || @ Phillies || 1–4 || Pettibone (2–0) || Nolasco (2–3) || Papelbon (5) || 36,292 || 8–22 || L3
|- style="text-align:center;" bgcolor="#bbffbb"
| 31 || May 4 || @ Phillies || 2–0 || Fernández (1–2) || Hamels (1–4) || Cishek (4) || 40,091 || 9–22 || W1
|- style="text-align:center;" bgcolor="#bbffbb"
| 32 || May 5 || @ Phillies || 14–2 || Slowey (1–2) || Halladay (2–4) ||  || 45,276 || 10–22 || W2
|- style="text-align:center;" bgcolor="#ffbbbb"
| 33 || May 6 || @ Padres || 0–5 || Cashner (2–2) || LeBlanc (0–5) ||  || 14,596 || 10–23 || L1
|- style="text-align:center;" bgcolor="#ffbbbb"
| 34 || May 7 || @ Padres || 1–5 || Stults (3–2) || Sanabia (2–5) ||  || 16,263 || 10–24 || L2
|- style="text-align:center;" bgcolor="#ffbbbb"
| 35 || May 8 || @ Padres || 0–1 || Marquis (4–2) || Nolasco (2–4) || Street (8) || 16,730 || 10–25 || L3
|- style="text-align:center;" bgcolor="#bbffbb"
| 36 || May 10 || @ Dodgers || 5–4 || Fernández (2–2) || Belisario (2–4) || Cishek (5) || 41,721 || 11–25 || W1
|- style="text-align:center;" bgcolor="#ffbbbb"
| 37 || May 11 || @ Dodgers || 1–7 || Ryu (4–2) || Slowey (1–3) ||  || 42,208 || 11–26 || L1
|- style="text-align:center;" bgcolor="#ffbbbb"
| 38 || May 12 || @ Dodgers || 3–5 || Capuano (1–2) || Koehler (0–1) ||  || 43,959 || 11–27 || L2
|- style="text-align:center;" bgcolor="#ffbbbb"
| 39 || May 14 || Reds || 2–6 || Bailey (2–3) || Nolasco (2–5) ||  || 14,694 || 11–28 || L3
|- style="text-align:center;" bgcolor="#ffbbbb"
| 40 || May 15 || Reds || 0–4 || Leake (3–2) || Sanabia (2–6) ||  || 14,866 || 11–29 || L4
|- style="text-align:center;" bgcolor="#ffbbbb"
| 41 || May 16 || Reds || 3–5 || Chapman (3–1) || Cishek (1–4) || Hoover (3) || 16,680 || 11–30 || L5
|- style="text-align:center;" bgcolor="#ffbbbb"
| 42 || May 17 || Diamondbacks || 2–9 || Cahill (3–4) || Slowey (1–4) ||  || 13,444 || 11–31 || L6
|- style="text-align:center;" bgcolor="#ffbbbb"
| 43 || May 18 || Diamondbacks || 0–1 || McCarthy (1–3) || Koehler (0–2) ||  || 18,786 || 11–32 || L7
|- style="text-align:center;" bgcolor="#bbffbb"
| 44 || May 19 || Diamondbacks || 2–1 || Nolasco (3–5) || Miley (3–3) || Dunn (1) || 20,206 || 12–32 || W1
|- style="text-align:center;" bgcolor="#bbffbb"
| 45 || May 20 || Phillies || 5–1 || Sanabia (3–6) || Hamels (1–7) ||  || 13,231 || 13–32 || W2
|- style="text-align:center;" bgcolor="#ffbbbb"
| 46 || May 21 || Phillies || 3–7 || Cloyd (1–0) || Below (0–1) ||  || 13,996 || 13–33 || L1
|- style="text-align:center;" bgcolor="#ffbbbb"
| 47 || May 22 || Phillies || 0–3 || Lee (5–2) || Slowey (1–5) ||  || 15,520 || 13–34 || L2
|- style="text-align:center;" bgcolor="#ffbbbb"
| 48 || May 24 || @ White Sox || 3–4 (11) || Jones (1–4) || Webb (1–2) ||  || 20,393 || 13–35 || L3
|- style="text-align:center;" bgcolor="#ffbbbb"
| 49 || May 25 || @ White Sox || 1–2 || Peavy (6–2) || Webb (1–3) ||  || 23,705 || 13–36 || L4
|- style="text-align:center;" bgcolor="#ffbbbb"
| 50 || May 26 || @ White Sox || 3–5 || Axelrod (3–3) || Sanabia (3–7) || Reed (17) || 25,464 || 13–37 || L5
|- style="text-align:center;" bgcolor="#ffbbbb"
| 51 || May 27 || @ Rays || 6–10 || McGee (2–2) || Fernández (2–3) || || 13,025 || 13–38 ||L6
|- style="text-align:center;" bgcolor="#ffbbbb"
| 52 || May 28 || @ Rays || 6–7 || Rodney (2–2)  || Dunn (1–1) || || 13,876 || 13–39 ||L7
|- style="text-align:center;" bgcolor="#ffbbbb"
| 53 || May 29 || Rays || 1–3 || Hernández (3–5) || Koehler (0–3) || Rodney (10) || 16,671 || 13–40 || L8
|- style="text-align:center;" bgcolor="#ffbbbb"
| 54 || May 30 || Rays || 2–5 || Colomé (1–0) || Nolasco (3–6) || Rodney (11) || 23,199 || 13–41 || L9
|- style="text-align:center;" bgcolor="#bbffbb"
| 55 || May 31 || Mets || 5–1 || Turner (1–0) || Marcum (0–6) ||  || 16,493 || 14–41 || W1
|-

|- style="text-align:center;" bgcolor="#bbffbb"
| 56 || June 1 || Mets || 8–1 || Fernández (3–3) || McHugh (0–1) ||  || 16,283 || 15–41 || W2
|- style="text-align:center;" bgcolor="#bbffbb"
| 57 || June 2 || Mets || 11–6 || LeBlanc (1–5) || Rice (3–4) ||  || 18,434 || 16–41 || W3
|- style="text-align:center;" bgcolor="#ffbbbb"
| 58 || June 3 || @ Phillies || 2–7 || Kendrick (6–3) || Koehler (0–4) ||  || 35,087 || 16–42 || L1
|- style="text-align:center;" bgcolor="#ffbbbb"
| 59 || June 4 || @ Phillies || 3–7 || Stutes (1–0) || Olmos (0–1) ||  || 38,932 || 16–43 || L2
|- style="text-align:center;" bgcolor="#ffbbbb"
| 60 || June 5 || @ Phillies || 1–6 || Hamels (2–9) || Ramos (0–2) ||  || 38,643 || 16–44 || L3
|- style="text-align:center;" bgcolor="bbbbbb"
| – || June 7 || @ Mets || colspan=7| Postponed (rain); Rescheduled as traditional doubleheader on September 14
|- style="text-align:center;" bgcolor="#bbffbb"
| 61 || June 8 || @ Mets || 2–1 (20) || Slowey (2–5) || Marcum (0–7) || Cishek (6) || 20,338 || 17–44 || W1
|- style="text-align:center;" bgcolor="#bbffbb"
| 62 || June 9 || @ Mets || 8–4 (10) || Qualls (1–0) || Parnell (4–3) ||  || 21,747 || 18–44 || W2
|- style="text-align:center;" bgcolor="#ffbbbb"
| 63 || June 10 || Brewers || 1–6 || Gallardo (5–6) || Nolasco (3–7) ||  || 13,259 || 18–45 || L1
|- style="text-align:center;" bgcolor="#bbffbb"
| 64 || June 11 || Brewers || 5–4 || Qualls (2–0) || Henderson (2–2) || Cishek (7) || 13,110 || 19–45 || W1
|- style="text-align:center;" bgcolor="#ffbbbb"
| 65 || June 12 || Brewers || 1–10 || Figaro (1–0) || Slowey (2–6) ||  || 13,468 || 19–46 || L1
|- style="text-align:center;" bgcolor="#bbffbb"
| 66 || June 14 || Cardinals || 5–4 || Fernández (4–3) || Westbrook (2–2) || Cishek (8) || 15,403 || 20–46 || W1
|- style="text-align:center;" bgcolor="#ffbbbb"
| 67 || June 15 || Cardinals || 7–13 || Lynn (9–1) || Koehler (0–5) ||  || 16,098 || 20–47 || L1
|- style="text-align:center;" bgcolor="#bbffbb"
| 68 || June 16 || Cardinals || 7–2 || Nolasco (4–7) || Lyons (2–3) || Cishek (9) || 18,468 || 21–47 || W1
|- style="text-align:center;" bgcolor="#bbffbb"
| 69 || June 17 || @ Diamondbacks || 3–2 || Dunn (2–1) || Bell (2–1) || Cishek (10) || 19,354 || 22–47 || W2
|- style="text-align:center;" bgcolor="#ffbbbb"
| 70 || June 18 || @ Diamondbacks || 2–3 || Hernandez (3–4) || Qualls (2–1) ||  || 21,067 || 22–48 || L1
|- style="text-align:center;" bgcolor="#ffbbbb"
| 71 || June 19 || @ Diamondbacks || 1–3 || Hernandez (4–4) || Fernández (4–4) || Bell (13) || 26,867 || 22–49 || L2
|- style="text-align:center;" bgcolor="#bbffbb"
| 72 || June 20 || @ Giants || 2–1 || Koehler (1–5) || Affeldt (1–3) || Cishek (11) || 41,290 || 23–49 || W1
|- style="text-align:center;" bgcolor="#bbffbb"
| 73 || June 21 || @ Giants || 6–3 || Ramos (1–2) || Dunning (0–1) || Cishek (12) || 41,490 || 24–49 || W2
|- style="text-align:center;" bgcolor="#ffbbbb"
| 74 || June 22 || @ Giants || 1–2 (11) || Rosario (2–0) || Dunn (2–2) ||  || 41,683 || 24–50 || L1
|- style="text-align:center;" bgcolor="#bbffbb"
| 75 || June 23 || @ Giants || 7–2 || Eovaldi (1–0) || Cain (5–4) ||  || 41,697 || 25–50 || W1
|- style="text-align:center;" bgcolor="#bbffbb"
| 76 || June 25 || Twins || 4–2 || Ramos (2–2) || Correia (6–5) || Cishek (13) || 14,581 || 26–50 || W2
|- style="text-align:center;" bgcolor="#bbffbb"
| 77 || June 26 || Twins || 5–3 || Slowey (3–6) || Diamond (5–7) || Cishek (14) || 15,318 || 27–50 || W3
|- style="text-align:center;" bgcolor="#ffbbbb"
| 78 || June 28 || Padres || 2–9 || Vólquez (6–6) || Nolasco (4–8) ||  || 18,347 || 27–51 || L1
|- style="text-align:center;" bgcolor="#bbffbb"
| 79 || June 29 || Padres || 7–1 || Turner (2–0) || Stults (6–6) ||  || 19,266 || 28–51 || W1
|- style="text-align:center;" bgcolor="#bbffbb"
| 80 || June 30 || Padres || 6–2 || Cishek (2–4) || Ross (0–4) ||  || 15,929 || 29–51 || W2
|-

|- style="text-align:center;" bgcolor="#bbffbb"
| 81 || July 1 || Padres || 4–0 || Fernández (5–4) || Marquis (9–4) || Cishek (15) || 14,669 || 30–51 || W3
|- style="text-align:center;" bgcolor="#ffbbbb"
| 82 || July 2 || @ Braves || 3–11 || Medlen (6–7) || Jennings (0–1) ||  || 28,045 || 30–52 || L1
|- style="text-align:center;" bgcolor="#bbffbb"
| 83 || July 3 || @ Braves || 6–3 || Nolasco (5–8) || Minor (8–4) || Cishek (16) || 26,129 || 31–52 || W1
|- style="text-align:center;" bgcolor="#bbffbb"
| 84 || July 4 || @ Braves || 4–3 || Ramos (3–2) || Kimbrel (2–2) || Cishek (17) || 35,465 || 32–52 || W2
|- style="text-align:center;" bgcolor="#ffbbbb"
| 85 || July 5 || @ Cardinals || 1–4 || Westbrook (5–3) || Turner (2–1) || Mujica (22) || 46,177 || 32–53 || L1
|- style="text-align:center;" bgcolor="#ffbbbb"
| 86 || July 6 || @ Cardinals || 4–5 || Mujica (1–1) || Ramos (3–3) ||  || 45,475 || 32–54 || L2
|- style="text-align:center;" bgcolor="#ffbbbb"
| 87 || July 7 || @ Cardinals || 2–3 || Lynn (11–3) || Fernández (5–5) || Mujica (23) || 43,741 || 32–55 || L3
|- style="text-align:center;" bgcolor="#ffbbbb"
| 88 || July 8 || Braves || 1–7 (14) || Carpenter (2–0) || Hatcher (0–1) ||  || 15,745 || 32–56 || L4
|- style="text-align:center;" bgcolor="#ffbbbb"
| 89 || July 9 || Braves || 4–6 || Teherán (7–4) || Álvarez (0–1) || Kimbrel (24) || 17,399 || 32–57 || L5
|- style="text-align:center;" bgcolor="#bbffbb"
| 90 || July 10 || Braves || 6–2 || Turner (3–1) || Maholm (9–8) ||  || 23,921 || 33–57 || W1
|- style="text-align:center;" bgcolor="#bbffbb"
| 91 || July 12 || Nationals || 8–3 || Eovaldi (2–0) || Strasburg (5–7) ||  || 16,861 || 34–57 || W2
|- style="text-align:center;" bgcolor="#bbffbb"
| 92 || July 13 || Nationals || 2–1 (10) || Cishek (3–4) || Stammen (4–4) ||  || 20,057 || 35–57 || W3
|- style="text-align:center;" bgcolor="#ffbbbb"
| 93 || July 14 || Nationals || 2–5 (10) || Stammen (5–4) || Cishek (3–5) || Soriano (25) || 19,766 || 35–58 || L1
|- style="text-align:center;" bgcolor="
|- style="background:#bbcaff;"
| – || July 16 ||colspan="8" |2013 Major League Baseball All-Star Game at Citi Field in Queens, New York
|- style="text-align:center;" bgcolor="#ffbbbb"
| 94 || July 19 || @ Brewers || 0–2 || Lohse (6–7) || Turner (3–2) || Rodríguez (10) || 30,316 || 35–59 || L2
|- style="text-align:center;" bgcolor="#ffbbbb"
| 95 || July 20 || @ Brewers || 0–6 || Gallardo (8–8) || Eovaldi (2–1) ||  || 37,446 || 35–60 || L3
|- style="text-align:center;" bgcolor="#ffbbbb"
| 96 || July 21 || @ Brewers || 0–1 (13) || Axford (4–3) || Webb (1–4) ||  || 30,073 || 35–61 || L4
|- style="text-align:center;" bgcolor="#bbffbb"
| 97 || July 22 || @ Rockies || 3–1 || Koehler (2–5) || Pomeranz (0–4) || Cishek (18) || 31,913 || 36–61 || W1
|- style="text-align:center;" bgcolor="#bbffbb"
| 98 || July 23 || @ Rockies || 4–2 || Fernández (6–5) || Chacín (9–5) || Cishek (19) || 34,223 || 37–61 || W2
|- style="text-align:center;" bgcolor="#ffbbbb"
| 99 || July 24 || @ Rockies || 1–2 || De la Rosa (10–5) || Turner (3–3) || Brothers (6) || 30,900 || 37–62 || L1
|- style="text-align:center;" bgcolor="#bbffbb"
| 100 || July 25 || @ Rockies || 5–3 || Jennings (1–1) || Ottavino (0–2) || Cishek (20) || 33,165 || 38–62 || W1
|- style="text-align:center;" bgcolor="#bbffbb"
| 101 || July 26 || Pirates || 2–0 || Álvarez (1–1) || Locke (9–3) || Cishek (21) || 18,718 || 39–62 || W2
|- style="text-align:center;" bgcolor="#ffbbbb"
| 102 || July 27 || Pirates || 4–7 || Morton (3–2) || Koehler (2–6) || Melancon (4) || 22,410 || 39–63 || L1
|- style="text-align:center;" bgcolor="#bbffbb"
| 103 || July 28 || Pirates || 3–2 || Fernández (7–5) || Cole (5–4) || Cishek (22) || 24,207 || 40–63 || W1
|- style="text-align:center;" bgcolor="#ffbbbb"
| 104 || July 29 || Mets || 5–6 || Aardsma (2–0) || Ramos (3–4) || Parnell (21) || 19,343 || 40–64 || L1
|- style="text-align:center;" bgcolor="#ffbbbb"
| 105 || July 30 || Mets || 2–4 (10) || Atchison (1–0) || Cishek (3–6) || Parnell (22) || 23,408 || 40–65 || L2
|- style="text-align:center;" bgcolor="#bbffbb"
| 106 || July 31 || Mets || 3–2 || Álvarez (2–1) || Mejía (1–1) || Dunn (2) || 18,714 || 41–65 || W1
|-

|- style="text-align:center;" bgcolor="#bbffbb"
| 107 || August 1 || Mets || 3–0 || Koehler (3–6) || Harvey (8–3) || Cishek (23) || 25,916 || 42–65 || W2
|- style="text-align:center;" bgcolor="#bbffbb"
| 108 || August 2 || Indians || 10–0 || Fernández (8–5) || Jiménez (8–6) ||  || 17,731 || 43–65 || W3
|- style="text-align:center;" bgcolor="#ffbbbb"
| 109 || August 3 || Indians || 3–4 || Allen (5–1) || Jennings (1–2) || Perez (16) || 22,997 || 43–66 || L1
|- style="text-align:center;" bgcolor="#ffbbbb"
| 110 || August 4 || Indians || 0–2 || Kazmir (7–4) || Eovaldi (2–2) || Perez (17) || 25,077 || 43–67 || L2
|- style="text-align:center;" bgcolor="#ffbbbb"
| 111 || August 6 || @ Pirates || 3–4 || Morris (5–4) || Dunn (2–3) ||  || 27,907 || 43–68 || L3
|- style="text-align:center;" bgcolor="#ffbbbb"
| 112 || August 7 || @ Pirates || 2–4 || Morton (4–3) || Koehler (3–7) || Melancon (7) || 28,173 || 43–69 || L4
|- style="text-align:center;" bgcolor="#ffbbbb"
| 113 || August 8 || @ Pirates || 4–5 (10) || Hughes (2–2) || Ames (0–1) ||  || 33,646 || 43–70 || L5
|- style="text-align:center;" bgcolor="#ffbbbb"
| 114 || August 9 || @ Braves || 0–5 || Beachy (1–0) || Turner (3–4) ||  || 37,424 || 43–71 || L6
|- style="text-align:center;" bgcolor="#bbffbb"
| 115 || August 10 || @ Braves || 1–0 || Dunn (3–3) || Walden (4–2) || Cishek (24) || 42,177 || 44–71 || W1
|- style="text-align:center;" bgcolor="#ffbbbb"
| 116 || August 11 || @ Braves || 4–9 || Minor (12–5) || Jennings (1–3) ||  || 32,881 || 44–72 || L1
|- style="text-align:center;" bgcolor="#ffbbbb"
| 117 || August 12 || @ Royals || 2–6 || Davis (6–9) || Koehler (3–8) ||  || 15,956 || 44–73 || L2
|- style="text-align:center;" bgcolor="#bbffbb"
| 118 || August 13 || @ Royals || 1–0 (10) || Qualls (3–1) || Herrera (4–6) || Cishek (25) || 21,094 || 45–73 || W1
|- style="text-align:center;" bgcolor="#bbffbb"
| 119 || August 14 || @ Royals || 5–2 || Jennings (2–3) || Collins (2–6) || Cishek (26) || 17,760 || 46–73 || W2
|- style="text-align:center;" bgcolor="#ffbbbb"
| 120 || August 16 || Giants || 10–14 || Rosario (3–0) || Eovaldi (2–3) ||  || 26,166 || 46–74 || L1
|- style="text-align:center;" bgcolor="#ffbbbb"
| 121 || August 17 || Giants || 4–6 || Cain (8–8) || Álvarez (2–2) || Romo (30) || 24,653 || 46–75 || L2
|- style="text-align:center;" bgcolor="#bbffbb"
| 122 || August 18 || Giants || 6–5 || Qualls (4–1) || Rosario (3–1) || Cishek (27) || 23,113 || 47–75 || W1
|- style="text-align:center;" bgcolor="#bbffbb"
| 123 || August 19 || Dodgers || 6–2 || Fernández (9–5) || Ryu (12–4) ||  || 27,127 || 48–75 || W2
|- style="text-align:center;" bgcolor="#ffbbbb"
| 124 || August 20 || Dodgers || 4–6 || Withrow (2–0) || Jennings (2–4) || Jansen (20) || 25,690 || 48–76 || L1
|- style="text-align:center;" bgcolor="#ffbbbb"
| 125 || August 21 || Dodgers || 1–4 || Greinke (12–3) || Eovaldi (2–4) || Jansen (21) || 24,996 || 48–77 || L2
|- style="text-align:center;" bgcolor="#ffbbbb"
| 126 || August 22 || Dodgers || 0–6 || Kershaw (13–7) || Álvarez (2–3) ||  || 25,609 || 48–78 || L3
|- style="text-align:center;" bgcolor="#ffbbbb"
| 127 || August 23 || Rockies || 2–3 || Chacín (12–7) || Qualls (4–2) || Brothers (12) || 19,253 || 48–79 || L4
|- style="text-align:center;" bgcolor="#bbffbb"
| 128 || August 24 || Rockies || 3–0 || Fernández (10–5) || Manship (0–4) || Cishek (28) || 23,333 || 49–79 || W1
|- style="text-align:center;" bgcolor="#ffbbbb"
| 129 || August 25 || Rockies || 3–4 || de la Rosa (14–6) || Turner (3–5) || Brothers (13) || 20,191 || 49–80 || L1
|- style="text-align:center;" bgcolor="#ffbbbb"
| 130 || August 27 || @ Nationals || 1–2 || Ohlendorf (3–0) || Eovaldi (2–5) || Soriano (34) || 24,616 || 49–81 || L2
|- style="text-align:center;" bgcolor="#ffbbbb"
| 131 || August 28 || @ Nationals || 3–4 || Storen (4–2) || Dunn (3–4) || Soriano (35) || 24,394 || 49–82 || L3
|- style="text-align:center;" bgcolor="#ffbbbb"
| 132 || August 29 || @ Nationals || 0–9 || Gonzalez (8–6) || Koehler (3–9) ||  || 27,374 || 49–83 || L4
|- style="text-align:center;" bgcolor="#ffbbbb"
| 133 || August 30 || @ Braves || 1–2 || Teherán (11–7) || Fernández (10–6) || Varvaro (1) || 28,255 || 49–84 || L5
|- style="text-align:center;" bgcolor="#ffbbbb"
| 134 || August 31 || @ Braves || 4–5 (11) || Ayala (2–1) || Webb (1–5) ||  || 32,727 || 49–85 || L6
|-

|- style="text-align:center;" bgcolor="#bbffbb"
| 135 || September 1 || @ Braves || 7–0 || Eovaldi (3–5) || Wood (3–3) ||  || 38,441 || 50–85 || W1
|- style="text-align:center;" bgcolor="#bbffbb"
| 136 || September 2 || @ Cubs || 4–3 || Álvarez (3–3) || Wood (8–11) || Cishek (29) || 26,978 || 51–85 || W2
|- style="text-align:center;" bgcolor="#bbffbb"
| 137 || September 3 || @ Cubs || 6–2 || Webb (2–5) || Jackson (7–15) ||  || 30,024 || 52–85 || W3
|- style="text-align:center;" bgcolor="#ffbbbb"
| 138 || September 4 || @ Cubs || 7–9 || Villanueva (4–8) || Webb (2–6) || Gregg (29) || 20,696 || 52–86 || L1
|- style="text-align:center;" bgcolor="#bbffbb"
| 139 || September 6 || Nationals || 7–0 || Fernández (11–6) || Haren (8–13) ||  || 25,118 || 53–86 || W1
|- style="text-align:center;" bgcolor="#ffbbbb"
| 140 || September 7 || Nationals || 2–9 || Roark (5–0) || Eovaldi (3–6) ||  || 28,336 || 53–87 || L1
|- style="text-align:center;" bgcolor="#ffbbbb"
| 141 || September 8 || Nationals || 4–6 || Strasburg (7–9) || Turner (3–6) || Soriano (39) || 18,990 || 53–88 || L2
|- style="text-align:center;" bgcolor="#ffbbbb"
| 142 || September 9 || Braves || 2–5 || Medlen (13–12) || Álvarez (3–4) || Kimbrel (45) || 18,503 || 53–89 || L3
|- style="text-align:center;" bgcolor="#ffbbbb"
| 143 || September 10 || Braves || 3–4 || Teherán (12–7) || Koehler (3–10) || Kimbrel (46) || 19,095 || 53–90 || L4
|- style="text-align:center;" bgcolor="#bbffbb"
| 144 || September 11 || Braves || 5–2 || Fernández (12–6) || Minor (13–7) ||  || 25,111 || 54–90 || W1
|- style="text-align:center;" bgcolor="#ffbbbb"
| 145 || September 12 || Braves || 1–6 || García (4–6) || Flynn (0–1) ||  || 15,274 || 54–91 || L1
|- style="text-align:center;" bgcolor="#ffbbbb"
| 146 || September 13 || @ Mets || 3–4 || Niese (7–7) || Hand (0–1) || Hawkins (9) || 20,562 || 54–92 || L2
|- style="text-align:center;" bgcolor="#bbffbb"
| 147 || September 14 (1) || @ Mets || 3–0 || Álvarez (4–4) || Torres (3–5) || Cishek (30) || see 2nd game || 55–92 || W1
|- style="text-align:center;" bgcolor="#ffbbbb"
| 148 || September 14 (2) || @ Mets || 1–3 || Matsuzaka (1–3) || Turner (3–7) || Hawkins (10) || 25,175 || 55–93 || L1
|- style="text-align:center;" bgcolor="#ffbbbb"
| 149 || September 15 || @ Mets || 0–1 || Black (1–0) || Phillips (0–1) ||  || 25,165 || 55–94 || L2
|- style="text-align:center;" bgcolor="#ffbbbb"
| 150 || September 16 || @ Phillies || 2–12 || Lee (14–6) || Dyson (0–1) ||  || 31,266 || 55–95 || L3
|- style="text-align:center;" bgcolor="#ffbbbb"
| 151 || September 17 || @ Phillies || 4–6 || Halladay (4–4) || Flynn (0–2) || Papelbon (28) || 28,872 || 55–96 || L4
|- style="text-align:center;" bgcolor="#bbffbb"
| 152 || September 18 || @ Phillies || 4–3 (10) || Hand (1–1) || Jiménez (1–1) || Cishek (31) || 28,908 || 56–96 || W1
|- style="text-align:center;" bgcolor="#ffbbbb"
| 153 || September 19 || @ Nationals || 2–3 || Gonzalez (11–7) || Álvarez (4–5) || Soriano (42) || 25,945 || 56–97 || L1
|- style="text-align:center;" bgcolor="#ffbbbb"
| 154 || September 20 || @ Nationals || 0–8 || Zimmermann (19–8) || Turner (3–8) ||  || 34,752 || 56–98 || L2
|- style="text-align:center;" bgcolor="#bbbbbb"
| – || September 21 || @ Nationals || colspan=7| Postponed (rain); Rescheduled as day-night doubleheader on September 22
|- style="text-align:center;" bgcolor="#bbffbb"
| 155 || September 22 (1) || @ Nationals || 4–2 || Koehler (4–10) || Haren (9–14) || Cishek (32) || 35,101 || 57–98 || W1
|- style="text-align:center;" bgcolor="#ffbbbb"
| 156 || September 22 (2) || @ Nationals || 4–5 || Soriano (3–3) || Dyson (0–2) ||  || 34,824 || 57–99 || L1
|- style="text-align:center;" bgcolor="#bbffbb"
| 157 || September 23 || Phillies || 4–0 || Eovaldi (4–6) || Halladay (4–5) ||  || 18,627 || 58–99 || W1
|- style="text-align:center;" bgcolor="#ffbbbb"
| 158 || September 24 || Phillies || 1–2 || Stutes (3–1) || Álvarez (4–6) || Papelbon (29) || 19,375 || 58–100 || L1
|- style="text-align:center;" bgcolor="#bbffbb"
| 159 || September 25 || Phillies || 3–2 || Qualls (5–2) || Martin (2–5) || Cishek (33) || 19,180 || 59–100 || W1
|- style="text-align:center;" bgcolor="#bbffbb"
| 160 || September 27 || Tigers || 3–2 || Koehler (5–10) || Álvarez (1–5) || Cishek (34) || 26,992 || 60–100 || W2
|- style="text-align:center;" bgcolor="#bbffbb"
| 161 || September 28 || Tigers || 2–1 (10) || Cishek (4–6) || Reed (0–1) ||  || 28,750 || 61–100 || W3
|- style="text-align:center;" bgcolor="#bbffbb"
| 162 || September 29 || Tigers || 1–0 || Álvarez (5–6) || Putkonen (1–3) ||  || 28,315 || 62–100 || W4
|-

Roster

2013 Player stats

Batting
Note: G = Games played; AB = At bats; R = Runs scored; H = Hits; 2B = Doubles; 3B = Triples; HR = Home runs; RBI = Runs batted in; AVG = Batting average; SB = Stolen bases

Pitching
Note: W = Wins; L = Losses; ERA = Earned run average; G = Games pitched; GS = Games started; SV = Saves; IP = Innings pitched; H = Hits allowed; R = Runs allowed; ER = Earned runs allowed; BB = Walks allowed;  K = Strikeouts

Farm system

References

External links

2013 Miami Marlins season at Baseball Reference

Miami Marlins season
Miami Marlins
Miami Marlins seasons